Llanfaredd Halt railway station was an unstaffed railway station opened by the Great Western Railway on 7 May 1934 on the old Mid-Wales line between Builth Wells railway station and Aberedw railway station in Powys, Wales.

The rarely used station consisted of a small wooden platform and shelter, on the eastern side of the single line.  After closure on 31 December 1962 the station was demolished and station area and trackbed has been levelled into a field. Not far away was a spur to the Builth Stone quarries.

References

Further reading

Railway stations in Great Britain opened in 1934
Railway stations in Great Britain closed in 1962
Disused railway stations in Powys
Former Great Western Railway stations